Klaus Aeffke (born 9 May 1940) is a retired German rower who was most successful in the eights. In this event he won a silver medal at the 1964 Summer Olympics, a world title in 1962, and three European titles in 1963–1965.

References

1940 births
Living people
People from Neustrelitz
People from Mecklenburg
West German male rowers
Sportspeople from Mecklenburg-Western Pomerania
Olympic rowers of the United Team of Germany
Rowers at the 1964 Summer Olympics
Olympic silver medalists for the United Team of Germany
Olympic medalists in rowing
World Rowing Championships medalists for West Germany
Medalists at the 1964 Summer Olympics
European Rowing Championships medalists